Cyrenaica Transitional Council also shortened as CTC is the claimed government of the Libyan Region of Cyrenaica formed in 6 March 2012

References

Cyrenaica